Miriam Butkereit (born 8 May 1994) is a German judoka.

She is the bronze medallist of the 2021 Judo Grand Slam Tel Aviv in the -70 kg category.

References

External links
 
 

1994 births
Living people
German female judoka
European Games competitors for Germany
Judoka at the 2019 European Games
20th-century German women
21st-century German women